Mills Island is an uninhabited island in Chincoteague Bay. The island is within the borders of Worcester County in the state of Maryland. The smaller Assacorkin Island lies just of the north off the island's north shore. Mills Island is marshy and is rapidly eroding.

References 

Uninhabited islands of Maryland